Harrison "Harry" Swartz (born March 19, 1996) is an American professional soccer player who plays as a midfielder for USL Championship club New Mexico United.

Career
Swartz is from Needham, Massachusetts. He played soccer at Needham High School, where he was a 2011 Bay State League First Team pick after breaking the school record for most points as a sophomore. In 2012, he was a silver medalist with the United States in the 2012 Pan American Games in Sao Paulo, Brazil. In 2013, he was rated among the top 150 high school seniors by College Soccer News.

College and amateur
Swartz spent five years playing college soccer at Northeastern University between 2014 and 2018, scoring 5 goals and tallying 5 assists in 71 appearances. Swartz is Jewish, and was named to the 2017 Jewish Sports Review Division 1 Men's Soccer All-America Team, along with  Sam Raben and Jake Rozhansky.

Swartz also played for USL PDL sides Ocean City Nor'easters, Boston Bolts and Brazos Valley Cavalry.

Professional
On May 3, 2019, Swartz signed for USL Championship side Hartford Athletic. Swartz was named team MVP for the 2019 season and re signed with Hartford for the 2020 season.

Following the 2020 season, it was announced that Swartz would join New Mexico United ahead of 2021.

Career statistics

References

External links
Northeastern bio
Hartford Athletic bio
 

Living people
1996 births
American soccer players
Jewish American sportspeople
Jewish footballers
Association football defenders
Northeastern Huskies men's soccer players
Brazos Valley Cavalry FC players
Ocean City Nor'easters players
Boston Bolts players
Hartford Athletic players
New Mexico United players
Soccer players from Massachusetts
Sportspeople from Needham, Massachusetts
USL League Two players
USL Championship players
21st-century American Jews